"Everybody Salsa" is a single by UK band Modern Romance. It was their first UK chart entry in 1981, reaching No. 12. It was released as a 7-inch single and 12-inch single by WEA. It was also released in the United States, Benelux, Germany, France, Italy and Mexico and was produced by David Jaymes, Geoff Deane and Norman Mighell.

Formats
7-inch single
Everybody Salsa 
Salsa Rappsody
12-inch single
Everybody Salsa/Salsa Rappsody [Discomix]
Salsa Rappsody [Dub Discomix]
12-inch single
Everybody Salsa/Salsa Rappsody [Extended Discomix]
Salsa Rappsody [Dub Discomix]
12-inch promo single (U.S.)
Everybody Salsa
Bring on the Funkateers
12-inch single (Mexico)
Everybody Salsa [Todo Mundo Salsa]
Salsa Rappsody [Rapsodia En Salsa]
12-inch single (Benelux)
Everybody Salsa/Salsa Rappsody [Extended Discomix]
Salsa Rappsody [Dub Discomix]
7-inch single (Germany)
Everybody Salsa
Salsa Rappsody
7-inch single (Benelux)
Everybody Salsa
Salsa Rappsody
7-inch single (Italy)
Everybody Salsa
Salsa Rappsody
7-inch single
Everybody Salsa
Salsa Rappsody

History
"Everybody Salsa" was originally a UK hit for Modern Romance in 1981 and was included on their debut album, Adventures in Clubland (1981) as part of the Clubland Mix along with "Ay Ay Ay Ay Moosey", "Salsa Rappsody", and "Moose on the Loose". It was one of the few Modern Romance records to feature drummer, Tony Gainsborough. The single also made its way onto the compilation albums Party Tonight (1983) and Modern Romance: The Platinum Collection (2006). It was also a part of their farewell single, Best Mix of Our Lives (1985), an anthology single of the band's biggest hits.

Chart position
UK Chart #12

Other versions
"O Superman"/"Everybody Salsa" - Laurie Anderson / Modern Romance [Italy; Spain] (1982)
"Everybody Salsa" b/w "Can You Move" '88 - David Jaymes (1988)

Personnel
Geoff Deane - vocals
David Jaymes - bass guitar
Robbie Jaymes - synthesizer
Paul Gendler - guitar
Tony Gainsborough - drums
David Jaymes, Geoff Deane, Norman Mighell - Producer (music)

References

External links
Modern Romance - Official Charts Company

1981 singles
Modern Romance (band) songs
Songs written by David Jaymes
Songs written by Geoff Deane
1981 songs
Warner Music Group singles